Mirza Ali Khan La'li, also known as Hakim La'li (1845–1907), was a writer and physician who wrote satirical Azerbaijani poetry "in the traditional style".

Born in Erivan (Yerevan), at a young age, La'li moved to Qajar Iran and settled in Tabriz. He pursued his medical studies in Constantinople (Istanbul) and returned to Tabriz afterwards, where he worked as a doctor until his death in 1907.

References

Sources
 

1845 births
1907 deaths
Writers from Yerevan
Emigrants from the Russian Empire to Iran
Azerbaijani-language poets
19th-century Iranian poets
20th-century Iranian poets
19th-century Iranian physicians
20th-century Iranian physicians